Gredyakino is a rural locality (a selo) in Krasnogvardeysky District, Belgorod Oblast, Russia. The population was 632 as of 2010. There are 2 streets.

Geography 
Gredyakino is located 29 km west of Biryuch (the district's administrative centre) by road. Razdrornoye is the nearest rural locality.

References 

Rural localities in Krasnogvardeysky District, Belgorod Oblast